Song of the West is a 1930 American Pre-Code musical western film produced by Warner Bros., and photographed entirely in Technicolor. It was based on the 1928 Broadway musical Rainbow by Vincent Youmans (music), Oscar Hammerstein II (lyrics) and Laurence Stallings (book). It starred John Boles, Joe E. Brown and Vivienne Segal, and was the first all-color all-talking feature to be filmed entirely outdoors.

Plot
The story takes place in 1849. Captain Stanton (John Boles) has been cited for a court martial because of a misunderstanding over a woman with Major Davolo. As a scout, he is sent to escort a wagon train which is under military escort. It turns out that this escort is his own former regiment. When he meets Davolo, there is another fight between Stanton and Davolo in which Davolo is killed.

The colonel has Stanton put in the guard house on a murder charge. He escapes disguised as a parson and continues along with the wagon train in order to be near Virginia, the daughter of his former commander, played by Vivienne Segal. They fall in love and when Stanton decides to leave the wagon train, Virginia follows him.

Stanton marries Virginia and opens a gambling hall. When the regiment eventually turns up at the gambling hall, Virginia makes merry with her former friends. Stanton, in a fit of jealousy, leaves the establishment with another woman and tries his luck in California, searching for gold. He has poor luck and becomes a derelict. Eventually he meets his wife in San Francisco, resulting in a happy reconciliation. Some soldiers find him and give him a choice between being deported or re-enlisting in the army. He re-enlists. Joe E. Brown, in the part of Hasty, his doomed sidekick, provided the comedy for the film.

Cast
John Boles as Captain Stanton
Vivienne Segal as Virginia
Joe E. Brown as Hasty
Marie Wells as Lotta
Sam Hardy as Davolo
Marion Byron as Penny
Eddie Gribbon as Sergeant Major
Edward Martindel as Colonel
Rudolph Cameron as Lt. Singleton

Production
This was Boles's follow-up to his successful role in The Desert Song (1929). The film was finished in June 1929. Following a number of dismal previews, however, Warner Bros. shortened the film by two reels, removing some of the musical content in the process. In spite of being delayed for almost a year before release, the film had a worldwide gross of $920,000 and the featured songs were quite popular, leading RCA Victor to hire Boles, who was then at the height of his popularity, to record "The One Girl" and "West Wind" for commercial release.

Songs 
All written by Vincent Youmans and Oscar Hammerstein II unless indicated
"The One Girl" (sung by Boles)
"I Like You As You Are" (sung by Boles)
"Come Back to Me" (sung by Boles and Vivienne Segal) (by Harry Akst and Grant Clarke)
"The Bride Was Dressed in White" (sung by Joe E. Brown)
"West Wind" (sung by John Boles) (music by Vincent Youmans, lyric by J. Russell Robinson)
"Kingdom Coming" (sung by chorus) (authors unknown)

Preservation

Since the 1970s, no copies of the film are known to exist. The complete soundtrack survives.

Although the film's copyright was renewed in 1956, it does not appear to have been shown on television. 16mm prints of early Warner Bros. films, including sound-on-disc films, were made in the 1950s for distribution as local television package (see Associated Artists Productions), and some two-color Technicolor films now survive (in black and white) only because of those prints. Some pre-1931 sound films made by Warner Bros. and First National have been lost because United Artists (former rights holder of pre-1950 WB films) donated most films to foreign film preservation or private collector and presently it is impossible to search for a film after when UA donated to the Library of Congress the earliest surviving preprint material from the pre-1950 (including some pre-1931) film library of Warner Bros. and post-1923 First National library.

In a June 2011 forum discussion, a small fragment, running about a minute, was claimed to have been discovered in the UK and identified as being from the film. It is available on DVD from the Warner Archive Collection. One short fragment of an original color print was identified in the British Film Institute archives in 2018.

See also
List of lost films
List of incomplete or partially lost films
List of early color feature films
List of early Warner Bros. sound and talking features

References

External links

New York Times review

1930 films
1930s color films
American Western (genre) films
1930 Western (genre) films
Warner Bros. films
American films based on plays
1930s English-language films
Films directed by Ray Enright
Films set in San Francisco
Films set in 1849
American Western (genre) musical films
1930s Western (genre) musical films
Early color films
1930 musical films
1930s American films